Takarnia is a peak in the Bukowica Range (part of the Pogórze Bukowskie ) in southern Poland. Its height is 778 meters.
The southern part is a steep rocky wall, while the other side consist of less steep rocky fields. The Bukowica Range separating the west Low Beskids from the east Pogórze Bukowskie.

Hiking trails
 European walking route E8
 Iwonicz-Zdrój – Rymanów-Zdrój - Puławy – Tokarnia (778 m) – Przybyszów – Kamień (717 m) – Komańcza (Główny Szlak Beskidzki)
 Pasmo Bukowicy - Kanasiówka (823 m) – Wisłok Wielki – Tokarnia (778 m), 1 km – Wola Piotrowa
 Komańcza – Dołżyca – Garb Średni (822 m) – Kanasiówka (823 m) – Moszczaniec – Surowica – Darów – Puławy Górne– Besko

See also 
 Bieszczady National Park

Tarnica
Mountains of the Eastern Carpathians
Landforms of Podkarpackie Voivodeship